Viha ja Viikate is the ninth EP by the black metal band Horna. It was released on Woodcut Records in 2003. It was then re-released by Obscure Abhorrence Productions on LP format and was limited to 400 copies.

Track listing

Viha Ja Viikate - 3:15
Ars Laternarum - 4:31
Mustasiipinen - 4:18
Kun 1000 Kuuta On Kiertänyt - 3:33

Personnel

Additional personnel
 Christophe Szpajdel - logo

External links
Metal Archives
Official Horna Site

Horna EPs
2003 EPs